Sargis Karapetyan (born 3 September 1963) is a retired football defender from Armenia. He played one international match for the national team, on 14 October 1992 against Moldova. The match finished 0–0.

References

Armenian footballers
Armenia international footballers
Association football defenders
Soviet footballers
Soviet Armenians
FC Shirak players
Armenian Premier League players
1963 births
Living people